Five Houses is a hamlet on the Isle of Wight, off the south coast of England. The settlement is in the civil parish of Calbourne, Newtown and Porchfield.

The hamlet lies to the south of the A3054 road, near to the larger village of Calbourne.

Hamlets on the Isle of Wight